Pennsylvania Railroad 6755 is a 4-8-2 "Mountain" type steam locomotive built in 1930 for the Pennsylvania Railroad by the railroad's own Altoona Works as a member of the M1b locomotive class for mainline freight service. Retired from commercial service in 1957, the locomotive was preserved by the Pennsylvania Railroad and was placed on display at the Railroad Museum of Pennsylvania in Strasburg, Pennsylvania. The 6755 is the only M1 class locomotive to have survived into preservation.

History

The 6755 was built by the Altoona Works in 1930. The 6755 was a class M1a and was used predominantly in freight service, though it would occasionally be used for passenger trains.  In 1953, the locomotive went back to the Altoona Works and was rebuilt into a class M1b. The locomotive continued to be used for freight service until January 1957, when it was retired from the roster.

Present status
The 6755 is on static display at the Railroad Museum of Pennsylvania in Strasburg, Pennsylvania. The 6755 has since been deteriorating at a rapid pace, with its boiler jackets removed in the early 2000s. Prolonged exposure to the elements has wreaked havoc on major parts of the locomotive, causing structural rust. The 6755 is one of the locomotives the museum plans to place inside the roundhouse currently under construction as of March, 2014.

Gallery

See also

NYC 3001- This is the New York Central Railroad's version of the M1 that survives. Just like the 6755, the 3001 was a dual-service locomotive.

References

Railway locomotives on the National Register of Historic Places in Pennsylvania
Transportation in Lancaster County, Pennsylvania
4-8-2 locomotives
Railway locomotives introduced in 1930
6755
Collection of the Railroad Museum of Pennsylvania
Standard gauge locomotives of the United States
National Register of Historic Places in Lancaster County, Pennsylvania

Preserved steam locomotives of Pennsylvania
Individual locomotives of the United States